The SV Resolven was a merchant brig which was found abandoned on 29 August 1884, with her lifeboat missing, between Baccalieu Island and Catalina, Newfoundland and Labrador. The abandoned vessel was found by HMS Mallard. The last entry in her logbook was within six hours of her being sighted.
Other than a broken yard, she had suffered minimal damage. The galley fire was alight and the lamps were burning. A large iceberg was sighted nearby. It has been claimed that none of the seven crew members or four passengers were accustomed to northern waters and it was suggested that they panicked when the ship was damaged by ice, launched the lifeboat, and swamped, though no bodies were found. The ship was towed into the nearby port, refitted and put out to sea again. No trace was found of her crew. The mystery of this ship earned it the nickname "The Welsh Mary Celeste". Three years later, Resolven was wrecked while returning to Newfoundland from Nova Scotia with a load of lumber.

See also 
List of people who disappeared mysteriously at sea

References

1880s missing person cases
Ghost ships
Maritime incidents in August 1884
Missing person cases in Canada
Mass disappearances